Goniothalamus chinensis is a species of plant in the Annonaceae family. It is found in China and Vietnam.

References

chinensis
Least concern plants
Trees of China
Trees of Vietnam
Taxonomy articles created by Polbot
Plants described in 1934
Taxa named by Elmer Drew Merrill